State Route 269 (SR 269) is a  route that extends northwestward from Birmingham to Jasper.  The route runs west of Interstate 22 (I-22) and roughly parallels that route.  Other towns along the route include Maytown, Sylvan Springs, and Parrish.

Route Description

The southern terminus of SR 269 is at the junction with I-20/I-59 at Exit 120 in western Birmingham.  The route leads through the Ensley community along 20th Street, passing by the former U.S. Steel Ensley works.  After leaving Birmingham, the route leads through several small communities in western Jefferson County into Walker County.  The northern terminus of the route is at its junction with SR 69 west of Jasper.

Major intersections

References

269
269
Transportation in Jefferson County, Alabama
Transportation in Walker County, Alabama